The Men's 50 metre butterfly event at the 2010 Commonwealth Games took place on 5 and 6 October 2010, at the SPM Swimming Pool Complex.

Six heats were held, with most containing the maximum number of swimmers (eight). The heat in which a swimmer competed did not formally matter for advancement, as the swimmers with the top sixteen times advance to the semifinals and the top eight times from there qualified for the finals.

Heats

Semifinals

Semifinal 1

Semifinal 2

Final

References

Aquatics at the 2010 Commonwealth Games
Men's 50 metre butterfly